The 1990–91 Kentucky Wildcats men's basketball team represented University of Kentucky in the 1990–91 NCAA Division I men's basketball season. The head coach was Rick Pitino and the team finished the season with an overall record of 22–6. While they won the regular-season SEC title, they were ineligible to participate in either the SEC or NCAA Tournaments, as they were in the final year of a multi-year postseason ban.

References 

Kentucky Wildcats men's basketball seasons
Kentucky
Kentucky
Kentucky Wildcats men's b
Kentucky Wildcats men's b